The Réunion des Opéras de France, commonly known as the ROF, is the professional association of opera companies in France. It provides information resources for the opera sector and the public, supports its member companies through meetings, and promotes the art form.

The association was founded in 1964 as the Réunion des Théâtres Lyriques Municipaux de France (RTLMF), changed its name to the Réunion des Théâtre Lyriques de France (RTLF) in 1991, finally getting its current name of the Réunion des Opéras de France (ROF) in 2003.

List of members
As of March 2015, the ROF membership comprised 26 opera houses, lyric festivals and theatres:

 Angers-Nantes Opéra
 Opéra Grand Avignon (fr)
 Opéra National de Bordeaux
 Théâtre de Caen (fr)
 Opéra de Dijon 
 Opéra de Lille
 Opéra de Limoges (fr)
 Opéra National de Lyon
 Opéra de Marseille
 Opéra de Massy (fr)
 Opéra-Théâtre de Metz Métropole
 Opéra national de Montpellier Languedoc-Roussillon
 Opéra national de Lorraine
 Opéra de Nice
 Chorégies d'Orange
 Opéra national de Paris
 Théâtre national de l'Opéra Comique
 Opéra de Reims (fr)
 Opéra de Rennes (fr)
 Opéra de Rouen Haute-Normandie (fr)
 Opéra Théâtre de Saint-Étienne (fr)
 Opéra national du Rhin
 Opéra Toulon Provence Méditerranée
 Théâtre du Capitole de Toulouse
 Opéra de Tours (fr)
 Opéra Royal de Versailles

References

Sources
 Réunion des Opéras de France website

Opera organizations
Arts organizations established in 1964
Music organizations based in France